Alexander Leslie, 1st Earl of Leven (1582–1661) was a Scottish soldier in Dutch, Swedish and Scottish service.

Alexander Leslie may also refer to:

Alexander Leslie, Earl of Ross (died 1402), Scottish nobleman
Alexander Leslie (British Army officer) (1731–1794), officer active during the American Revolutionary War
Alexander Leslie-Melville, Lord Balgonie (1831–1857), British soldier
Alexander Leslie, Lord Balgonie (died c. 1642); see Earl of Leven
Alexander Leslie, 2nd Earl of Leven (c. 1637–1664), Earl of Leven
Alexander Leslie, 5th Earl of Leven (1695–1754)
Alexander Leslie (engineer) (1844–1893), Scottish civil engineer
Alexander Leslie of Auchintoul (1590–1663), Russian general of Scottish origin

See also
Alexander Leslie-Melville (disambiguation)
Leslie Alexander (disambiguation)